Tol-e Heydari (also Romanized as Tol-e Ḩeydarī) is a village in Bakesh-e Yek Rural District, in the Central District of Mamasani County, Fars Province, Iran. At the 2006 census, its population was 22, in 4 families.

References 

Populated places in Mamasani County